|}

The Adonis Juvenile Novices' Hurdle is a Grade 2 National Hunt hurdle race in United Kingdom which is open to horses aged four years. It is run at Kempton Park over a distance of about 2 miles, and during its running there are eight hurdles to be jumped. The race is for novice hurdlers, and it is scheduled to take place each year in late February.

The event serves as a principal trial for the Triumph Hurdle in March. Since 1988, six horses have won both races – Mysilv, Katarino, Snow Drop, Penzance, Soldatino and Zarkandar. Prior to 1994, the race was known as the Tote Placepot Hurdle.

Records
Leading jockey (3 wins):
 Adrian Maguire – Mysilv (1994), Zabadi (1996), L'Opera (1997)
 Mick Fitzgerald – Katarino (1999), Punjabi (2007), Binocular (2008)

Leading trainer (5 wins):
 Nicky Henderson – Katarino (1999), Punjabi (2007), Binocular (2008), Soldatino (2010), Fusil Raffles (2019)
 Alan King - Trouble at Bay (2004), Penzance (2005), Master Blueyes (2017), Redicean (2018), Tritonic (2021)

Winners

See also
 Horse racing in Great Britain
 List of British National Hunt races

References
 Racing Post:

External links 
 pedigreequery.com – Adonis Juvenile Novices' Hurdle – Kempton.

National Hunt races in Great Britain
Kempton Park Racecourse
National Hunt hurdle races